Hereward the Wake was a British television series, which was produced by the BBC in 1965, and was broadcast weekly on BBC1. It was based on the 1866 novel by Charles Kingsley. Alfred Lynch played the title role. Due to the BBC's policy of erasing video tape for reuse in the 1960s and 1970s, the entire series is lost; no episodes survive in the BBC archive.

Cast
Alfred Lynch as Hereward the Wake (16 episodes)
Bryan Pringle as Martin Lightfoot (16 episodes)
Yvonne Furneaux as Torfrida (11 episodes)
John Carson as William the Conqueror (9 episodes)
Alan Rowe as Ivo Taillebois (8 episodes)
Francis de Wolff as Gilbert of Ghent (8 episodes)
Justine Lord as Alftruda (7 episodes)
David Swift as Prior Herluin (7 episodes)
John Collin as Winter (6 episodes)
Peter Needham as Gwenoch (6 episodes)
Aimée Delamain as Lapp nurse (6 episodes)
Clive Graham as Sir Raoul de Selignat (5 episodes)
Dorothy Reynolds as Lady Godiva (5 episodes)
Alan Lake as Edwin (4 episodes)
Arthur Cox as Pery (4 episodes)
Peter Stephens as Thorold (4 episodes)
David Neal as Ranald of Ramsey (4 episodes)
Kynaston Reeves as Baldwin (3 episodes)
Patrick Holt as Abbot of St. Bertin (3 episodes)
Raymond Platt as Arnoul (3 episodes)
Peter Arne as Harold Godwinson (3 episodes)
Margaret Vines as Gyda (3 episodes)
Gilbert Wynne as Morcar (3 episodes)
John Wentworth as Abbot Brand (3 episodes)
Michael Miller as Horsa (3 episodes)
John Harvey as Abbot Thurstan (2 episodes)
Elizabeth Knight as Constance (2 episodes)
Nicola Pagett as Princess Anja (2 episodes)
Margaret John as Judith (2 episodes)
John Sharp as King Alef (2 episodes)
Archie Duncan as Ironhook (2 episodes)
Anthony Boden as Raoul (2 episodes)
Douglas Milvain as Asbjorn (2 episodes)
Will Stampe as Landlord (2 episodes)
George Merritt as Surturbrand (2 episodes)
Toke Townley as Priest (2 episodes)
Jonathan Hansen as Sir Ragnar (2 episodes)
Jean Aubrey as Astrid (2 episodes)
Lavender Sansom as Lise (2 episodes)
Trudy Moors as Young Alftruda (2 episodes)
William Hobbs as Sir Frotho (2 episodes)
Nick Edmett as Sir Edgar (2 episodes)
Clemence Bettany as Leonie (2 episodes)
Donald Eccles as Witch (1 episode)
George Coulouris as Thord Gunlaugsson (1 episode)
Godfrey James as Svend (1 episode)
Alethea Charlton as Gunhilda (1 episode)
Desmond Newling as Olaf (1 episode)
Peter Williams as King Sweyn (1 episode)
Kathleen Byron as Adeta (1 episode)
Michael Collins as Gareth (1 episode)
Ian Patterson as Dolfin (1 episode)
Pamela Reed as Queen to Edward the Confessor (1 episode)
Walter Sparrow as Trewint (1 episode)
Vernon Dobtcheff as Priest (1 episode)
Raymond Llewellyn as Leofwyn (1 episode)
John Kidd as Earl Godwin (1 episode)
Paul Williamson as Tostig Godwinsson (1 episode)
John Baker as Priest (1 episode)
Roger Booth as Gilbert's Cook (1 episode)
Kenton Moore as Jarl (1 episode)
Kate O'Mara as Richilda (1 episode)
John Ringham as Wilton of Ely(1 episode)
Valerie Bell as Flemish Girl (1 episode)
Nicholas Brent as Captain (1 episode)
Sheila Dunn as Gertrude (1 episode)
Milton Johns as First Witch (1 episode)
Marie Adams as Second Witch (1 episode)
Michael Bilton as Ursus (1 episode)
Paddy Fast as English Woman (1 episode)
Eric Francis as Yway (1 episode)
Ronald Herdman as Gleeman (1 episode)
Marguerite Young as Constance's Nurse (1 episode)
Bernard Finch as Brother Simon (1 episode)
Christopher Hodge as Priest (1 episode)
Gertan Klauber as Chief Cook (1 episode)
Anthony Sagar as François (1 episode)
Steven Scott as Louis (1 episode)
Anton Darby as Stable Boy (1 episode)
Roger Brierley as Walfric the Heron (1 episode)
Edward Caddick as First Gamekeeper (1 episode)
Arthur R. Webb as Second Gamekeeper (1 episode)
George Howe as Edward the Confessor (1 episode)
Tony Steedman as Earl Leofric (1 episode)

List of episodes

References

External links

BBC television dramas
Lost BBC episodes
Lost television shows
1965 British television series debuts
1965 British television series endings
1960s British drama television series
Historical television series
Television series set in the 11th century
Cultural depictions of William the Conqueror
Television series set in the Viking Age
Television series set in the Middle Ages
Television shows set in Europe
English-language television shows
Black-and-white British television shows